James Martin Johnston (December 8, 1895 – December 28, 1967) was the co-owner of the Washington Senators of the American League with James Lemon from  until his death in . In 1963, Johnston and Lemon purchased the franchise from Elwood Richard Quesada. His estate and James Lemon sold the team to a group of Minnesota buyers in 1968.

Johnston, who attended UNC Chapel Hill from 1913 to 1915, posthumously set up one of the university's largest need-based scholarship funds, now known as the James M. Johnston Trust for Charitable and Educational Purposes.

Johnston died in 1967 in Washington of cancer.

References

External links
Texas Rangers owners

1895 births
1967 deaths
American investment bankers
Businesspeople from North Carolina
Major League Baseball owners
University of North Carolina alumni
Washington Senators (1961–1971) owners